The 2007 Orlando Predators season was the 17th season for the franchise. They finished the season with an 8–8 record and lost in the first round of the playoffs to the Philadelphia Soul, 41–26.

Schedule

Playoff schedule

Coaching
Jay Gruden started his fourth season as head coach of the Predators. He'd also coached for four years from 1998–2001.

Personnel moves

Acquired
Orlando signed Shane Stafford in the off-season
On June 13, Orlando signed disgruntled wide receiver T.T. Toliver after he had been released by Tampa Bay

Departures

2007 roster

Stats

Offense

Passing

Rushing

Receiving

Touchdowns

Defense

*Lineman of the year

Special teams

Kick return

Kicking

Playoff Stats

Offense

Passing

Rushing

Receiving

Special teams

Kick return

Kicking

Regular season

Week 1: at Tampa Bay Storm

Scoring Summary:

1st Quarter:
ORL- DeAndrew Rubin 34 YD pass from Shane Stafford (Jay Taylor kick) – 7–0 ORL
ORL- DeAndrew Rubin 42 YD pass from Shane Stafford (Jay Taylor kick) – 14–0 ORL
ORL- Jimmy Fryzel 19 YD pass from Shane Stafford (Jay Taylor kick) – 21–0 ORL
TB- T.T. Toliver 27 YD pass from John Kaleo (PAT failed) – 21–6 ORL

2nd Quarter:
TB- Rodney Filer 1 YD Run (PAT failed) – 21–12 ORL
ORL- Javarus Dudley 1 YD Run (Jay Taylor kick) – 28–12 ORL

3rd Quarter:
TB- Bill Gramatica 37 YD FG – 28–15 ORL
ORL- DeAndrew Rubin 28 YD pass from Shane Stafford (Jay Taylor kick) – 35–15 ORL
TB- Demetris Bendross 39 YD pass from John Kaleo (PAT failed) – 35–21 ORL

4th Quarter:
ORL- Jay Taylor 20 YD – 38–21 ORL
TB- Demetris Bendross 18 YD pass from John Kaleo (PAT failed) – 38–27 ORL
ORL- Shane Stafford 3 YD Run (Jay Taylor kick) – 45–27 ORL
ORL- Javarus Dudley 37 YD pass from Shane Stafford (Jay Taylor kick) – 52–27 ORL

Attendance: 15,619

Week 2: vs Los Angeles Avengers

Scoring Summary:

1st Quarter:

2nd Quarter:

3rd Quarter:

4th Quarter:

Week 3: vs Austin Wranglers

Scoring Summary:

1st Quarter:

2nd Quarter:

3rd Quarter:

4th Quarter:

Week 4: vs Dallas Desperados

Scoring Summary:

1st Quarter:

2nd Quarter:

3rd Quarter:

4th Quarter:

Week 5: at New Orleans VooDoo

Scoring Summary:

1st Quarter:

2nd Quarter:

3rd Quarter:

4th Quarter:

Week 7: vs Tampa Bay Storm

Scoring Summary:

1st Quarter:

2nd Quarter:

3rd Quarter:

4th Quarter:

Week 8: vs New York Dragons

Scoring Summary:

1st Quarter:

2nd Quarter:

3rd Quarter:

4th Quarter:

Week 9: at Las Vegas Gladiators

Scoring Summary:

1st Quarter:

2nd Quarter:

3rd Quarter:

4th Quarter:

Week 10: at Georgia Force

Scoring Summary:

1st Quarter:

2nd Quarter:

3rd Quarter:

4th Quarter:

Week 11: vs New Orleans VooDoo

Scoring Summary:

1st Quarter:

2nd Quarter:

3rd Quarter:

4th Quarter:

Week 12: at Austin Wranglers

Scoring Summary:

1st Quarter:

2nd Quarter:

3rd Quarter:

4th Quarter:

Week 13: vs Utah Blaze

Scoring Summary:

1st Quarter:

2nd Quarter:

3rd Quarter:

4th Quarter:

Week 14: at San Jose SaberCats

Scoring Summary:

1st Quarter:

2nd Quarter:

3rd Quarter:

4th Quarter:

Week 15: at New York Dragons

Scoring Summary:

1st Quarter:

2nd Quarter:

3rd Quarter:

4th Quarter:

Week 16: vs Georgia Force

Scoring Summary:

1st Quarter:

2nd Quarter:

3rd Quarter:

4th Quarter:

Week 17: at Philadelphia Soul

Scoring Summary:

1st Quarter:

2nd Quarter:

3rd Quarter:

4th Quarter:

Playoffs

Week 1: vs (4) Philadelphia Soul

Scoring Summary:

1st Quarter:

2nd Quarter:

3rd Quarter:

4th Quarter:

External links
Predators stat page

Orlando Predators
Orlando Predators seasons
2007 in sports in Florida
2000s in Orlando, Florida